Sir Terence Farrell  (born 12 May 1938), known as Terry Farrell, is a British architect and urban designer. In 1980, after working for 15 years in partnership with Sir Nicholas Grimshaw, Farrell founded his own firm, Farrells. He garnered a strong reputation for contextual urban design schemes, as well as exuberant works of postmodernism such as the MI6 Building. In 1991, his practice expanded internationally, opening an office in Hong Kong. In Asia his firm designed KK100 in Shenzhen, the tallest building ever designed by a British architect, as well as Guangzhou South railway station, once the largest railway station in Asia.

At the 2013 invitation of Ed Vaizey, the Minister for Culture, Communications and Creative Industries, his firm commenced the Farrell Review of Architecture and the Built Environment, intended to offer expert guidance on the direction of British architecture.

Early life and education
Farrell was born in Sale, Cheshire. His maternal grandfather was born in Manchester to an Irish mother who had emigrated to England from Ireland to escape Great Famine. As a youth he moved to Newcastle upon Tyne, where he attended St Cuthbert's Grammar School. He graduated with a degree in architecture from Newcastle University School of Architecture, Planning and Landscape (then part of Durham University) in 1961, followed by a Masters in urban planning at the University of Pennsylvania in Philadelphia.

Career
In 1965, Farrell moved to London to form a partnership with Sir Nicholas Grimshaw. In 1980, he founded his own company, Terry Farrell & Partners. In addition, Farrell lectures at a number of different universities including Cambridge University, the University of London, the University of Pennsylvania and the University of Sheffield.

In the early part of his career, Farrell gave emphasis to housing projects. Later, after the break with Grimshaw, he became the UK's principal postmodernist and was best known for the TV-am headquarters in Camden Lock and the redevelopment of Comyn Ching Triangle in London's Covent Garden. In the 1980s and 1990s his projects included Charing Cross Station, the MI6 headquarters building, The Deep Aquarium in Hull and The International Centre for Life in Newcastle. More recent work includes the new headquarters for the Home Office, the conversion of the Grade I-listed Royal Institution of Great Britain and the Great North Museum in Newcastle.

He has been responsible for regeneration projects in the UK including Newcastle Quayside, Brindleyplace in Birmingham, Edinburgh Exchange District, Greenwich Peninsula and Paddington Basin. He has also designed his own buildings within these projects, including the Edinburgh International Conference Centre and The Point in Paddington Basin. In May 2010, he was appointed to regenerate the  area around Earl's Court exhibition centre. In 2012 his practice was appointed as masterplanners for Wood Wharf – the next phase of Canary Wharf's development.

In East Asia, projects include Incheon International Airport in Seoul and Beijing South railway station, the largest in Asia. When completed in December 2010 Guangzhou South railway station was for a time the largest railway station in the world. Since setting up his practice in Hong Kong in 1990, he has designed the Peak Tower, Kowloon Station development and the British Consulate-General, Hong Kong. His KK100 tower in Shenzhen is the tallest building ever by a British architect.

Farrell is on the Design Advisory Committee of the Mayor of London. In 2008 he was appointed Design and Planning Leader for the Thames Gateway, Europe's largest regeneration project.

Farrell was named CBE in 1996 and made a Knight Bachelor in 2001.

He was made a visiting professor at the School of Architecture, Planning and Landscape at Newcastle University, and also an honorary freeman of Newcastle, in 2016. In 2018, he donated £1 million and his archive to the university.

Personal life
Farrell has been married three times, and has five children and six grandchildren.

Selected awards
The Herman Miller factory in Bath, UK (joint project with Nicholas Grimshaw), completed 1976: the Financial Times Industrial Award (1977), Civic Trust Award (1978), RIBA South West Award (1978), Grade II listing by English Heritage (2013)
The Henley Regatta Headquarters, completed 1986: Civic Trust Awards (1988), RIBA award (1988)
Charing Cross railway station/Embankment Place, completed 1990: Civic Trust Award (1991 & 1994), RIBA National Award (1991), British Council of Offices Award (1994)
Edinburgh International Conference Centre, completed 1995: (RIBA Award (1996), Civic Trust Award (1996)
Newcastle Quayside, completed 1998: Civic Trust Urban Design Award (1998)
Centre for Life, Newcastle upon Tyne, completed 2000: Civic Trust Award (2002)
The Home Office building, completed 2005: (RIBA International Award (2005), LEAF Award for Best Public Building (2005), the MIPIM Award for Business Centres (2008)
The Green Building in Manchester, ongoing: Civic Trust Award for Sustainability (2006 & 2010), LEAF Award for Best Environmentally Sustainable Project (2006)
Beijing South railway station, completed in 2008: RIBA International Award (2009)
Great North Museum, completed in 2009: RIBA Award for North East England (2010)
The Earls Court Project, ongoing: MIPIM AR Future Projects Award for regeneration and planning (2011)

Selected publications
2014 The Farrell Review of Architecture and the Built Environment
2013 The City As A Tangled Bank: Urban Design versus Urban Evolution, John Wiley and Sons London
2009 Shaping London: The patterns and forms that make the metropolis, John Wiley and Sons London 
April 2008 Prospect, 12 Challenges for Edinburgh
Sept 2007 Architectural Review, Manifesto For London
2004 Place, Terry Farrell's Life & Work: Early Years to 1981 London
2003 Buckingham Palace Redesigned: A Radical New Approach to London's Royal Parks , Papadakis 
2002 Terry Farrell in Scotland foreword by Dr. Brian Edwards, Edinburgh
2002 The Deep The World's Only Submarium – An Icon for Hull foreword by The Rt Hon John Prescott, London
2002 Ten Years: Ten Cities The Work of Terry Farrell & Partners 1991–2001 foreword by Sir Terry Farrell, Introduction by Hugh Pearman, Text by Jane Tobin, London
1999 PA Pro Architect 13 Terry Farrell, Seoul
1998 Sketchbook 12.05.98 Terry Farrell & Partners with essays by Robert Maxwell and Terry Farrell, London
1998 98:06 World Architecture Review Special Issue: Terry Farrell & Partners Shenzen
1998 Kowloon Transport Super City Terry Farrell & Partners/Steven Smith, Hong Kong
1994 Terry Farrell Selected and Current Works introduction by Clare Melhuish, Victoria
1993 Terry Farrell Urban Design introduction by Kenneth Powell, London/Berlin
1993 Blueprint Extra 09, Three Urban Projects text by Piers Gough, London
1993 World Architecture Building Profile No 1 Lightweight Classic Terry Farrell's Covent Garden nursery building, London
1992 Vauxhall Cross: The story of the design and construction of a new London landmark, Kenneth Powell, London
1991 Palace on the River Terry Farrell's design for the redevelopment of Charing Cross, Marcus Binney, London
1989 A U special feature: Terry Farrell & Company’ Japan, December pp. 37–132
1987 Terry Farrell in the context of London catalogue by Rowan Moore with an introduction by Deyan Sudjic, published to coincide with the exhibition at the RIBA Heinz Gallery 14 May to 13 June 1987, London
1986 Designing a House Charles Jencks and Terry Farrell, London
1984 Architectural Monographs: Terry Farrell introduction by Terry Farrell, texts by Colin Amery and Charles Jencks, London

References

External links

Terry Farrell and Partners

1938 births
 Living people
 People from Sale, Greater Manchester
 Harkness Fellows
 Modernist architects from England
Postmodern architects
 People from Newcastle upon Tyne
 People educated at St. Cuthbert's School
 Alumni of King's College, Newcastle
 Architects from Greater Manchester
 Knights Bachelor
 Commanders of the Order of the British Empire
 University of Pennsylvania School of Design alumni